Sagittaria filiformis, the threadleaf arrowhead, is an aquatic plant species native to the eastern United States, from Maine south to Florida and Alabama. it occurs in flowing streams in the northern part of its range, but more stagnant waters such as marshes and swamps in the South.

Sagittaria filiformis is a perennial herb up to 170 cm tall. Some leaves are thread-like, entirely underwater, but others are narrowly ovate or lanceolate and floating on the surface.

References

External links
photo of herbarium specimen at Missouri Botanical Garden, holotype of Sagittaria filiformis, collected in Alabama
photo of herbarium specimen at Missouri Botanical Garden, Sagittaria filiformis, collected in Florida
Center for Aquatic and Invasive Plants, University of Florida
Go Botany, New England Wildflower Society
Maine Department of Agriculture Conservation and Forestry, Maine Natural Areas Program, 

filiformis
Flora of the Eastern United States
Freshwater plants
Plants described in 1894